Thailand Institute of Scientific and Technological Research (TISTR) is a scientific research institute of Thailand's Ministry of Higher Education, Science, Research and Innovation. Its headquarters is in Pathum Thani Province, Thailand.

External links
 Thailand Institute of Scientific and Technological Research

Research institutes in Thailand
Buildings and structures in Pathum Thani province
State enterprises of Thailand